Muhammad Tariq Khattak is a Pakistani politician who had been a member of the National Assembly of Pakistan from 2008 to 2013. He had been a member of the Khyber Pakhtunkhwa Assembly from 2002 to 2007.

Political career
He was elected to the Khyber Pakhtunkhwa Assembly as a candidate of Pakistan Peoples Party (PPP) from Constituency PF-12 (Nowshera—I) in 2002 Pakistani general election. He received 10,695 votes and defeated Mian Iftikhar Hussain, a candidate of Awami National Party (ANP).

He was elected to the National Assembly of Pakistan from Constituency NA-5 (Nowshera-1) as a candidate of PPP in 2008 Pakistani general election. He received 31,907 votes and defeated Tariq Hameed Khattak, a candidate of ANP.

He ran for the seat of the National Assembly from Constituency NA-5 (Nowshera-1) as a candidate of PPP in 2013 Pakistani general election but was unsuccessful. He received 10,171 votes and lost the seat to Pervez Khattak.

References

Living people
Pakistani MNAs 2008–2013
People from Nowshera District
North-West Frontier Province MPAs 2002–2007
Year of birth missing (living people)